Bidadari Cemetery (Malay: Perkuburan Bidadari, Chinese: 比达达利坟场) is a defunct cemetery in Singapore. It used to serve the Christian, Muslim, Hindu and Sinhalese communities, and accepted burials between 1907 and 1972. The site of Bidadari Cemetery used to be the Istana residence of one of Sultan Abu Bakar of Johor's wives. By 2006, all known graves were exhumed to make way for development of the Bidadari Estate.

History
A 45-acre estate in Singapore was first acquired by the British civil engineer Henry Minchin Simons in 1855, there he had the residence built between 1855 to 1861 and later exchanged it with William Napier for his Tyersall estate. 

The estate was subsequently sold to Temenggong Abu Bakar in the mid-1860s. He gave it to his second wife, a Danish woman Zubaidah binti Abdullah who was born Cecilia Catharina Lange, for her residence. Thus the estate and house was known as Bidadari and Istana Bidadari in reference to the beauty of the Temenggong's wife as compared to the fairies.

Soon after Abu Bakar was proclaimed the Sultan of Johor in 1885, Sultana Zubaidah moved to Johor.

Establishment
In 1902, the Municipal Commissioners officially declared the acquisition of 26 hectares of the property to be used as a cemetery, which would be named after the estate. The Bidadari Cemetery was officially opened on 1 January 1908.

There were several sections in the cemetery: The Christian section was across Upper Aljunied Road from the Muslim section, and was bounded by Upper Serangoon Road; the Muslim section (opened on 14 February 1910) was at the base of Mount Vernon, bounded by Upper Aljunied Road, Upper Serangoon Road, and Bartley Road; while the Hindu and Sinhalese sections were opened in 1929.

A 10-acre land near the east of the cemetery was acquired by Syed Shaik Abdul Rahman Alkaff of the prominent Singaporean-Arab Alkaff family. He built the Alkaff Gardens, which were styled as a Japanese landscaped garden with artificial lake and hills, Japanese arch, two Japanese wooden bridges and teahouses. It was opened to the public in 1930 and was the first Japanese garden in Singapore.

Apart from being a place of remembrance, the trails inside Bidadari Cemetery used to be very popular as a running route for members of the Gurkha Contingent.

The Bidadari Christian Cemetery accepted military burials from 1907 to 1941, including Christian soldiers killed during the 1915 Sepoy Mutiny. In 1957, the Christian soldiers buried there were reinterred at Ulu Pandan War Cemetery and later moved to Kranji War Cemetery. The cemetery was also one of the filming locations in Singapore for the 1967 film Pretty Polly.

The last burial at Bidadari Cemetery took place on 31 October 1972.

Exhumation
The area was earmarked for development in the government's 1998 land-use masterplan. Between 2001 and 2006, all known graves, consisting of 58,000 Christian and 68,000 Muslim graves, were exhumed. The majority of the Christian graves were unclaimed. The remains of Muslims were reburied at the Pusara Abidi Cemetery in Choa Chu Kang, while unclaimed Christians' remains were cremated, and their ashes scattered at sea between 24 and 29 March 2008.

Memorial Garden

In response to public feedback, Bidadari Memorial Garden was created in 2004 on the part of exhumed Hindu section of the former cemetery near Mount Vernon to display the former gates and gateposts and 21 tombstones from prominent persons' graves.

Developments
The Woodleigh MRT station which was constructed close to the western end of former Malay and Christian sections along the Upper Serangoon Road, was completed and operational in 2003 but remained closed due to low commuter traffic in the vicinity.

The Woodleigh MRT Station was opened eight years later in 19 June 2011. In late 2011, the Ministry of National Development (MND), developed a blueprint for a new housing estate with HDB flats and private housing on several parts of the former cemetery. Works began in 2012, with the first batch of built-to-order HDB flats expected to be ready in 2018.

Notable burials
Bidadari once had sections for Hindus, Muslims and Christians and many prominent people were buried here.
 Ahmad bin Ibrahim – Minister of Health and Minister of Labour
 Sunny Ang – Singaporean law student and convicted murderer, who was executed in 1967
 Regent Alfred John Bidwell – British architect who designed the Raffles Hotel
 Emily Maude Buckeridge  - Wife of Harry Nugent Buckeridge of 'Buckeridge's Studios' Singapore. Photographer and Artist.
 Douglas Campbell – British advisor in Johor
 Dr Lim Boon Keng – physician, writer, intellectual, and social reformer 
 Mrs Grace Yin – 2nd wife of Dr Lim Boon Keng
 Sir Song Ong Siang
 Mrs Joan Giles – wife of Carl Giles
 John Laycock
 Sir George Edward Noel Oehlers
 Syarif Masahor – Sarawakian rebel
 Augustine Podmore Williams – English sailor, on whose life Joseph Conrad based his novel Lord Jim.
 Sir Duncan George Stewart – Second Governor of Crown Colony of Sarawak
 L/Cpl Thomas (Big Tam) Darling – The Queen's Own Cameron Highlanders and LT Malaya Police
 Gertrude Bryde Hodge (1939) – founder of Malaysian Girl Guide movement
 Baharuddin Ariff – People's Action Party assemblyman from 1959 to 1961

Gallery

See also
British Association for Cemeteries in South Asia
Former cemeteries in Singapore
Alkaff Gardens

References

Bibliography
Victor R Savage, Brenda S A Yeoh (2004), Toponymics – A Study of Singapore Street Names, Eastern University Press, .

Demolished buildings and structures in Singapore
Cemeteries in Singapore
Serangoon
1908 establishments in Singapore
1972 disestablishments in Singapore